

R
Rakutenchi Cable (Common name. Okamoto MFG)
Rifu Line (Common name. East Japan Railway Company)
Rikuu-Sai Line (East Japan Railway Company)
Rikuu-Tō Line (East Japan Railway Company)
Rinkai Fukutoshin Line (Former name. Tokyo Waterfront Area Rapid Transit)
Rinkai Line (Tokyo Waterfront Area Rapid Transit)
Rinkai Main Line (Freight. Keiyo Rinkai Railway)
Rinkai Main Line (Freight. Sendai Rinkai Railway)
Rinkan Sun Line (Nickname. Nankai Electric Railway)
Rinkō Line (Freight. Taiheiyo Coal Services and Transportation)
Rokkō Cable Line (Rokko Maya Railway)
Rokkō Island Line (Kobe New Transit)
Rumoi Main Line (Hokkaido Railway Company)
Ryōmō Line (East Japan Railway Company)
Ryūgasaki Line (Kanto Railway)

S

Sagami Line (East Japan Railway Company)
Sagamihara Line (Keio Electric Railway)
Sagano Line (Nickname. West Japan Railway Company)
Sagano Scenic Line (Sagano Scenic Railway)
Saikyō Line (Nickname. East Japan Railway Company)
Sai-no-Kuni Stadium Line (Nickname. Saitama Railway)
Saitama Rapid Railway Line (Saitama Railway)
Saito Line (Nickname. Osaka Rapid Railway)
Saitozaki Line (Common name. Kyushu Railway Company)
Sakai Line (West Japan Railway Company)
Sakaisuji Line (Osaka Municipal Transportation Bureau)
Sakamoto Cable (Common name. Hieizan Railway)
Sakuradōri Line (Common name. Transportation Bureau City of Nagoya)
Sakurai Line (West Japan Railway Company)
Sakurajima Line (West Japan Railway Company)
Sakuramachi Branch Line (Nagasaki Electric Tramway)
Sambashi Line (Tosaden Kōtsū)
Sanda Line (Kobe Electric Railway)
Samatsu Line (Common name. East Japan Railway Company)
Sangi Line (Sangi Railway)
Sangū Line (Central Japan Railway Company)
San'in Main Line (West Japan Railway Company)
Sankō Line (West Japan Railway Company)
Sano Line (Tobu Railway)
San'yō Main Line (West Japan Railway Company, Kyushu Railway Company)
San'yō Shinkansen (West Japan Railway Company)
Sasaguri Line (Kyushu Railway Company)
Sasebo Line (Kyushu Railway Company)
Sassho Line (Hokkaido Railway Company)
Sawara Line (Common name. Hokkaido Railway Company)
Sayama Line (Seibu Railway)
Seaside Line (Nickname. Yokohama New Transit)
Seibu Chichibu Line (Seibu Railway) 
Seibu Yūrakuchō Line (Seibu Railway) 
Seibuen Line (Seibu Railway)
Seikan Tunnel Tappi Shakō Line (Seikan Tunnel Museum)
Seikibashi Line (Okayama Electric Tramway)
Seishin Extended Line (Kobe Municipal Transportation Bureau)
Seishin Line (Kobe Municipal Transportation Bureau)
Seishin-Yamate Line (Group name. Comprising the Seishin Line, Seishin Extended Line and Yamate Line. Kobe Municipal Transportation Bureau)
Sekishō Line (Hokkaido Railway Company)
Semboku Rapid Railway Line (Semboku Rapid Railway Co., Ltd.)
Semmō Main Line (Hokkaido Railway Company)
Sendai Airport Access Line (Nickname. East Japan Railway Company. Sendai Airport Transit)
Sendai Airport Line (Translation. Sendai Airport Transit)
Sendai Futō Line (Freight. Sendai Rinkai Railway)
Sendai Kūkō Line (Sendai Airport Transit)
Sendai Nishikō Line (Freight. Sendai Rinkai Railway)
Sennichimae Line (Osaka Municipal Transportation Bureau)
Senri Line (Hankyu Corporation)
Senseki Line (East Japan Railway Company)
Senzaki Branch Line (Common name. West Japan Railway Company)
Senzan Line (East Japan Railway Company)
Setagaya Line (Tokyo Kyuko Electric Railway)
Seto Line (Nagoya Railroad)
Seto-Ōhashi Line (Nickname. West Japan Railway Company, Shikoku Railway Company)
Setouchi Sazanami Line (Nickname. West Japan Railway Company)
Shibayama Railway Line (Shibayama Railway)
Shido Line (Takamatsu-Kotohira Electric Railroad)
Shigaraki Line (Shigaraki Kōgen Railway)
Shigi Line (Kintetsu Railway)
Shima Line (Kintetsu Railway)
Shimabara Railway Line (Shimabara Railway)
Shimanto Green Line (Nickname. Shikoku Railway Company)
Shimminato Line (Freight. Japan Freight Railway Company)
Shimminatokō Line (Man'yo Line)
Shinano Railway Line (Shinano Railway)
Shin'etsu Main Line (East Japan Railway Company)
Shinjuku Line (Seibu Railway)
Shinjuku Line (Tokyo Metropolitan Bureau of Transportation)
Shinonoi Line (East Japan Railway Company)
Shiomibashi Line (Common name. Nankai Electric Railway)
Shiomichō Line (Freight. Nagoya Rinkai Railway)
Shizuoka Shimizu Line (Shizuoka Railway)
Shōnan Monorail (Common name. Shonan Monorail)
Shōnan-Shinjuku Line (Nickname. East Japan Railway Company)
Shōwamachi Line (Freight. Nagoya Rinkai Railway)
Skyrail Midorizaka Line (Nickname. Skyrail Service)
Sōbu Line (Rapid) (Common name. East Japan Railway Company)
Sōbu Main Line (East Japan Railway Company)
Sōbu Nagareyama Line (Sobu Nagareyama Electric Railway)
Sotobō Line (East Japan Railway Company)
South Line (Translation. Freight. Akita Rinkai Railway)
Sōya Main Line (Hokkaido Railway Company)
Suigun Line (East Japan Railway Company)
Suikū Line (Nickname. East Japan Railway Company)
Suizenji Line (Kumamoto City Transportation Bureau)
Sukumo Line (Tosa Kuroshio Railway)
Sunzu Line (Izuhakone Railway)
Suzuka Line (Kintetsu Railway)

T

Tadami Line (East Japan Railway Company)
Taga Line (Ohmi Railway)
Tagawa Line (Heisei Chikuho Railway)
Taiheiyō Coal Services and Transportation Rinkō Line (Taiheiyō Coal Services and Transportation)
Taisha Line (Ichibata Electric Railway)
Taita Line (Central Japan Railway Company)
Takahama Line (Iyo Railway)
Takamori Line (Minamiaso Railway)
Takao Line (Keio Electric Railway)
Takao Tozan Cable (Common name. Takao Tozan Electric Railway)
Takaoka Tramway Line (Man'yo Line)
JR Takarazuka Line (Nickname. West Japan Railway Company) 
Takarazuka Main Line (Hankyu Corporation)
Takasaki Line (East Japan Railway Company)
Takashinohama Line (Nankai Electric Railway)
Takayama Main Line (Central Japan Railway Company, West Japan Railway Company)
Takehana Line (Nagoya Railroad)
Taketoyo Line (Central Japan Railway Company)
Tama Line (Odakyu Electric Railway)
Tamanoi Line (Common name. Nagoya Railroad)
Tama Urban Monorail Line (Tama Urban Monorail)
Tamagawa Line (Seibu Railway)
Tōkyū Tamagawa Line (Tokyo Kyuko Electric Railway) 
Tamako Line (Seibu Railway)
Tanagawa Line (Nankai Electric Railway)
Tanimachi Line (Osaka Municipal Transportation Bureau)
Taniyama Line (Kagoshima City Transportation Bureau)
Tarumi Line (Tarumi Railway)
Tasaki Line (Kumamoto City Transportation Bureau)
Tateyama Cable Car (Common name. Tateyama Kurobe Kanko)
Tateyama Line (Toyama Chiho Railway)
Tateyama Tunnel Trolleybus (Common name. Tateyama Kurobe Kanko)
Tatsuno Branch Line (Common name. East Japan Railway Company)
Tawaramoto Line (Kintetsu Railway)
Tazawako Line (East Japan Railway Company)
Tenjin Ōmuta Line (Nishi-Nippon Railroad)
Tenri Line (Kintetsu Railway)
Tenryū Hamanako Line (Tenryu Hamanako Railroad)
Toba Line (Kintetsu Railway)
Tōbu Kyūryō Line (Aichi Rapid Transit)
Tōchiku Line (Freight. Nagoya Rinkai Railway)
Tōgane Line (East Japan Railway Company)
Tōhō Line (Sapporo City Transportation Bureau)
Tōhoku Main Line (East Japan Railway Company)
Tōhoku Shinkansen (East Japan Railway Company)
Tōjō Line (Tobu Railway)
Tōkadai Line (Tokadai New Transit) Closed
Tōkaidō Main Line (East Japan Railway Company, Central Japan Railway Company, West Japan Railway Company)
Tōkaidō Shinkansen (Central Japan Railway Company)
Tōkō Line (Freight. Nagoya Rinkai Railway)
Tokoname Line (Nagoya Railroad)
Tokushima Line (Shikoku Railway Company)
Tōkyō Monorail Haneda Line (Tokyo Monorail)
Tōkyō Waterfront New Transit Waterfront Line (Yurikamome)
Tōkyū Tamagawa Line (Tokyo Kyuko Electric Railway) 
Toshima Line (Seibu Railway)
Tōsō Line (Kagoshima City Transportation Bureau)
Towada Hachimantai Shikisai Line (Nickname. East Japan Railway Company)
Towada Kankō Electric Railway Line (Towada Kanko Electric Railway)
Toyama City Tram Line (Group name. Comprising the tramway lines in Toyama city. Toyama Chiho Railway)
Toyama Light Rail Line (Toyama Light Rail)
Toyamakō Line (Toyama Light Rail)
Tōyō Rapid Line (Toyo Rapid Railway)
Toyokawa Line (Nagoya Railroad)
Tōyoko Line (Tokyo Kyuko Electric Railway)
Toyota Line (Nagoya Railroad)
Tōzai Line (Kobe Rapid Railway (services) )
Tōzai Line (Kyoto Municipal Transportation Bureau)
Tōzai Line (Sapporo City Transportation Bureau)
Tōzai Line (Sendai City Transportation Bureau) Under construction
Tōzai Line (Tokyo Metro)
JR Tōzai Line (West Japan Railway Company) 
Trolleybus Line (Tateyama Kurobe Kanko)
Trunk Line (Kumamoto City Transportation Bureau)
Tsugaru-Kaikyō Line (Nickname. East Japan Railway Company, Hokkaido Railway Company)
Tsugaru Line (East Japan Railway Company)
Tsugaru Railway Line (Tsugaru Railway)
Tsukuba Express Line (Metropolitan Intercity Railway Company)
Tsurumai Line (Common name. Transportation Bureau City of Nagoya)
Tsurumi Line (East Japan Railway Company)
Tsushima Line (Nagoya Railroad)
Tsuyama Line (West Japan Railway Company)

U

Ube Line (West Japan Railway Company)
Uchibō Line (East Japan Railway Company)
Uchiko Line (Shikoku Railway Company)
Uemachi Line (Hankai Electric Tramway)
Ueno Monorail (Tokyo Metropolitan Bureau of Transportation)
Uetsu Main Line (East Japan Railway Company)
Uji Line (Keihan Electric Railway)
Ujina Line (Hiroshima Electric Railway)
Ukishima Line (Freight. Kanagawa Rinkai Railway)
Umeda Freight Line (Common name. West Japan Railway Company)
Umi Line (Common name. Kyushu Railway Company)
Umineko Rail Hachinohe City Line (Nickname. East Japan Railway Company)
Umi-no-Nakamichi Line (Nickname. Kyushu Railway Company)
Umi-Shibaura Branch Line (Common name. East Japan Railway Company)
Uno Line (West Japan Railway Company)
Utsube Line (Kintetsu Railway)
Utsunomiya Line (Tobu Railway)
Utsunomiya Line (Nickname. East Japan Railway Company)
Utsunomiya Light Rail

W
Wadamisaki Line (Common name. West Japan Railway Company)
Wajima Line (Common name. Noto Railway)
Wakamatsu Line (Nickname. Kyushu Railway Company)
Wakasa Line (Wakasa Railway)
Wakayama Line (West Japan Railway Company)
Wakayamakō Line (Nankai Electric Railway)
Watarase Keikoku Line (Watarase Keikoku Railway)

Y

Yahiko Line (East Japan Railway Company)
Yakuri Cable (Common name. Shikoku Cable)
Yamada Line (East Japan Railway Company)
Yamada Line (Kintetsu Railway)
Yamagata Line (Nickname. East Japan Railway Company)
Yamagata Shinkansen (Nickname. East Japan Railway Company)
Yamaguchi Line (Seibu Railway)
Yamaguchi Line (West Japan Railway Company)
Yamanote Line (East Japan Railway Company)
Yamate Line (Kobe Municipal Transportation Bureau)
Yamatoji Line (Nickname. West Japan Railway Company)
Yashiro Line (Nagano Electric Railway)
Yasunoya Line (Toyama Chiho Railway)
Yatsugatake Kōgen Line (Nickname. East Japan Railway Company)
Yodo Line (Shikoku Railway Company)
Yōkaichi Line (Ohmi Railway)
Yokogawa Line (Hiroshima Electric Railway)
Yokogawara Line (Iyo Railway)
Yokohama Line (East Japan Railway Company)
Yokosuka Line (East Japan Railway Company)
Yonesaka Line (East Japan Railway Company)
Yōrō Line (Yōrō Railway)
Yosan Line (Shikoku Railway Company)
Yoshino Line (Kintetsu Railway)
Yoshinogawa Blue Line (Nickname. Shikoku Railway Company)
Yotsubashi Line (Osaka Municipal Transportation Bureau)
Yufu Kōgen Line (Nickname. Kyushu Railway Company)
Yui-Rail (Nickname. Okinawa Urban Monorail)
Yūkarigaoka Line (Yamaman)
Yumekamome (Nickname. Kobe Municipal Transportation Bureau)
JR Yumesaki Line (Nickname. West Japan Railway Company) 
Yunokawa Line (Hakodate City Transportation Bureau)
Yunomae Line (Kumagawa Railroad)
Yunoyama Line (Kintetsu Railway)
Seibu Yūrakuchō Line (Seibu Railway) 
Yūrakuchō Line (Tokyo Metro)
Yūrakuchō New Line (Tokyo Metro)
Yurikamome (Nickname. Yurikamome)
Yutorīto Line (Nickname. Nagoya Guideway Bus)

Z
Keikyu Zushi Line (Keihin Electric Express Railway)

List R